Amber Thomas (born November 17, 1993) is a Canadian swimmer. She lost her sight at ten years old due to a brain tumour and is classified in the S11 disability class.

At the age of fifteen Thomas competed at the 2008 Summer Paralympics but did not win any medals. In 2010, she came second in the 100 m butterfly and 400 m freestyle at the IPC World Championships. She entered six categories at the London 2012 Paralympics and gained two medals: bronze in the 200 m individual medley and silver in the 400 m freestyle.

Thomas is now retired from competitive swimming. She has stated an intention to work in animal massage and is considering competing in equestrianism in the future.

References

External links
 

Paralympic swimmers of Canada
Swimmers at the 2008 Summer Paralympics
Canadian blind people
Medalists at the 2012 Summer Paralympics
1993 births
Living people
S11-classified Paralympic swimmers
Paralympic silver medalists for Canada
Paralympic bronze medalists for Canada
Canadian female butterfly swimmers
Canadian female freestyle swimmers
Canadian female medley swimmers
Medalists at the World Para Swimming Championships
Paralympic medalists in swimming
21st-century Canadian women